The Lunalilo Mausoleum (also called Lunalilo's Tomb) is the final resting place of Hawaii's sixth monarch King Lunalilo and his father Charles Kanaʻina on the ground of the Kawaiahaʻo Church, in Downtown Honolulu on the Hawaiian Island of Oʻahu.

History
Lunalilo died from tuberculosis on February 3, 1874, after a short reign of a year. On his deathbed, Lunalilo had requested a burial at Kawaiahaʻo Church on the church's ground instead of Royal Mausoleum at Mauna ʻAla in Nuʻuanu Valley, the burial site of most modern Hawaiian monarchs. Historians have speculated that the democratically elected king wanted to be buried in the cemetery to be closer to the common people. Another reasoning for his refusal to be buried alongside his predecessors was rooted in a feud between Lunalilo and the Kamehameha family over his mother Kekāuluohi's exclusion from the list of royalty to be buried there in the 1860s. Kekāuluohi's remains were buried at sea by Lunalilo.

After his state funeral in 1874, Lunalilo's remains were temporarily interred at the Royal Mausoleum at Mauna ʻAla, awaiting the completion of the Lunalilo Mausoleum. The tomb was built under the instructions of his father Charles Kanaʻina, who survived him. Robert Lishman, an Englishman from Australia, designed and supervised the construction. On November 23, 1875, his remains were taken from the Royal Mausoleum to the almost completed tomb on the grounds of Kawaiahaʻo Church. His father requested a second funeral and a 21-gun salute from King Kalākaua like during the first royal funeral. Kalākaua granted the second funeral but refused to allow the 21-gun salute. During this procession, eyewitness reports stated that a sudden storm arose, and that twenty-one rapid thunderclaps echoed across Honolulu which came to be known as the "21-gun salute."

The tomb was completed in 1876. His father Charles Kanaʻina was buried in the vault after his death in 1877. A maternal cousin of Lunalilo Miriam Auhea Kekāuluohi Crowningburg served as kahu (caretaker) for the mausoleum until her death in 1899. In acknowledgement of her chiefly status, she was buried in the lot outside the vault of Lunalilo's Mausoleum. Her grandson William Bishop Taylor, who served as kahu for the Royal Mausoleum at Mauna ʻAla, would also later be buried within the same lot.

The interior of the Mausoleum contains the two koa wood caskets of Lunalilo and his father on red-carpeted floors. Three kāhili encased in Italian marble are set near the caskets. In 1917, Albert Gergbode and Paul Payne, two American naval sailors, broke into the tomb in search of burial goods and stole a silver crown and a silver plate inscribed with the biography of Lunalilo. The culprits melted down the silver objects and tried to pawn it in Key West, Florida, where they were arrested for the crime.

Interments

Lunalilo (1835–1874), sixth monarch of the Kingdom of Hawaii
Charles Kanaʻina (1801–1877), father of Lunalilo
Miriam Auhea Kekāuluohi Crowningburg (1839–1899), cousin of Lunalio, buried outside the tomb
William Edward Bishop Kaiheʻekai Taylor (1882–1956), grandson of Crowningburg, buried outside the tomb

See also
Royal Mausoleum of Hawaii
List of burials in the Royal Mausoleum of Hawaii

References

Bibliography

Buildings and structures in Honolulu
Burial sites of Hawaiian royal houses
Cemeteries in Hawaii
Landmarks in Hawaii
Mausoleums in the United States
Protected areas of Oahu
Royalty of the Hawaiian Kingdom
Buildings and structures completed in 1876
1876 establishments in Hawaii
House of Kalaimamahu